The 2017 Men's U23 African Volleyball Championship was the 2nd edition of the Men's U23 African Volleyball Championship, it was held in Algiers, Algeria from 20 to 22 February 2017. The winners Algeria qualified for the 2017 FIVB Volleyball Men's U23 World Championship.

Participated teams
After the cancellation of the 2016 edition in Durban, South Africa, the tournament, held at the last minute by the African Volleyball Confederation (CAVB), brought together only two countries, Algeria and Mauritius.

Venue

Round robin

|}

|}

Final standing

References

External links
Official website

U23
2017 in Algerian sport
International volleyball competitions hosted by Algeria
2017 in volleyball